Melhania suluensis is a plant in the family Malvaceae, native to southern Africa.

Description
The lower leaf surface is silvery-grey, the upper is darker. The flowers have yellow petals.

Distribution and habitat
Melhania suluensis is native to South Africa (KwaZulu-Natal, Northern Provinces) and Eswatini.

References

suluensis
Flora of KwaZulu-Natal
Flora of the Northern Provinces
Flora of Swaziland
Plants described in 1946